Luboš Perek (26 July 1919 – 17 September 2020) was a Czech astronomer best known for his Catalogue of Galactic Planetary Nebulae co-written in 1967 with Luboš Kohoutek. He worked on the distribution of mass in the galaxy, high-velocity stars, planetary nebulae, definition of outer space, geostationary orbit, space debris, and management of outer space.

Perek graduated from Masaryk University, Brno, in 1946, earned his PhD in Astronomy from Charles University, Prague, in 1956, and earned his DSc in Astronomy in 1961. He published 44 papers on stellar dynamics and planetary nebulae and 80 papers and articles on the geostationary orbit, definition of outer space, space debris, and protection of space environment.

The asteroid 2900 Luboš Perek, discovered by his fellow astronomer Kohoutek, was named after him. The largest telescope in the Czech Republic was also named after Perek.

Positions
 Corresponding Member of the Czechoslovak Academy of Sciences in 1965
 Associate Professor, Masaryk University from 1952 to 1956
 Visiting Professor, Northwestern University 1964
 General Secretary of the International Astronomical Union 1967–1970
 Director of the Astronomical Institute of Czechoslovak Academy of Sciences 1968–1975
 Chief, Outer Space Affairs Division, United Nations, New York City 1975–1980

Medals
 University of Liège (1969)
 ADION (1972)
 T. Hagecius de Hajek (1980)
 Nagy Ernö (1981)
 Zagreb University (1982)
 City of Paris (1982)
 Collège de France (1986)
 Prix Jules Janssen of the Societé Astronomique de France (1992)

References

External links

Czech astronomers
1919 births
2020 deaths
Masaryk University alumni
Czech centenarians
Men centenarians
Charles University alumni
Scientists from Prague
Czechoslovak astronomers